Parliamentary elections were held in Syria were held between 30 November and 1 December 1998 to elect members of the People's Council of Syria, the unicameral parliament. The result was a victory for the Ba'ath Party, which won 135 of the 250 seats. Voter turnout was 82%.

Results

References

Syria
1998 in Syria
Parliamentary elections in Syria
Election and referendum articles with incomplete results